Mariana is a Mexican telenovela produced by Televisa and transmitted by Telesistema Mexicano in 1970.

Cast 
Irma Lozano as Mariana
Enrique Aguilar
Socorro Avelar
Ada Carrasco
Ana Dublan

References

External links 

Mexican telenovelas
1970 telenovelas
Televisa telenovelas
Spanish-language telenovelas
1970 Mexican television series debuts
1970 Mexican television series endings